Pariabad (also Romanized as Parīābād; also known as Marīābād) is a village in Salehabad Rural District, Salehabad County, Razavi Khorasan Province, Iran. At the 2006 census, its population was 78, in 21 families.

References 

Populated places in   Torbat-e Jam County